Anyone is a band from Southern California that was formed in the late 1980's by Riz Story, Taylor Hawkins and Jon Davison. The band would undergo many changes in name and members before their 2001 self-titled album was released on Roadrunner Records. Anyone is led by Riz Story, the band's lead singer, guitarist, songwriter and producer, and also the only member of the band that has remained since its inception. Former members include David Silveria (Korn), Jon Davison (Yes, Glass Hammer, Sky Cries Mary), Taylor Hawkins (Foo Fighters), and Gretchen Menn.
The band toured in support of their debut studio album, notably at the Reading Festival, Leeds Festival and Lowland Festival, as well as American tours.  After disbanding in 2006 Anyone re-emerged in 2016 with Story remaining as the sole member and performing all instrumentation and all vocals as well as producing, mixing and mastering the bands output.

History
The group developed from the earlier band Sylvia, consisting of Story, drummer Taylor Hawkins (later of the Foo Fighters), guitarist Sean Murphy and Jon "Juano" Davison (later of Yes), which continued when Hawkins joined Sass Jordan's touring band, and Murphy began to work with bands Magdalen and Divinorum, and pursued a solo career. This led to the permanent name Anyone in 1995.

In 1996, Anyone's first demo album Rats Live on no Evil Star (a palindrome) was recorded. The live album Live Acid was released in 1999, and by 2000 the band was signed to Roadrunner Records and were working with producer Rick Parashar. Anyone was described by Roadrunner Records in 2001 as "the most innovative band of the new millennium!" - They were offered the biggest record deal in the label's history up to that point. They released their full-length studio debut Anyone in 2001.

Johnny Ransom replaced David (Nipples) Murray as drummer in 2002, and both Ransom and "Static" were replaced in 2004 by Mike Boano as drummer, Miki Black as guitarist and keyboardist, and Miles Martin on bass.

Re-emergence
The debut album Echoes and Traces was released worldwide on September 1, 2014, along with a music video for the first single "Beautiful World". Five songs from the album are featured in the film and soundtrack for Riz Story's motion picture, A Winter Rose.

In 2018 it was announced via the band's official website that a full-length documentary about the band would be released in 2019. Plans were also announced for the release of a new album entitled On the Ending Earth.

In August 2020, Anyone released its third studio album, On the Ending Earth.... On the Ending Earth received favorable reviews.  In January 2021, the band released the single My Death as a tribute to David Bowie who previously recorded the song.

On October 12, 2021, Anyone released its fourth studio album, In Humanity.

Music
They have been compared to Yes, Rush, King Crimson, Pink Floyd, Jane's Addiction, Radiohead and Tool. "Maximum Acid" is the term the press used to describe their sound, as a fusion of hard progressive rock and psychedelia. Their early sound was described as alternative rock and nu metal.

Discography
Rats Live on no Evil Star (1996, Demo Album)
Live Acid (1999, Live Album)
TogethermenT [Feature Film] (TogethermenT Films, 1999)
Anyone [CD] (Roadrunner Records, 2001, Debut Studio Album)
Real (Roadrunner Records, 2001, Single)
Maximum Acid (RoadRunner Records, 2001, EP Sampler)
The Story of Maximum Acid [DVD]
A Little Sip (2006, EP)
Echoes and Traces [CD] (TogethermenT Records, 2016, Second Studio Album)
Fly Away (TogethermenT Records, 2016, Single)
On the Ending Earth... [CD] (TogethermenT Records, 2020, Third Studio Album)
Live Acid - Deluxe Edition [CD] (TogethermenT Records, 2020)
Only Imagine"(TogethermenT Records, 2020, Single)
Traces - The Dream Mix (TogethermenT Records, 2020, Single)
Chasing Dragons to the Sea (TogethermenT Records, 2020, Single)
My Death (TogethermenT Records, 2021, Single)
In Humanity [2xCD] (TogethermenT Records, 2021, Fourth Studio Album, Double Album)
The Sylvia Sessions (TogethermenT Records, 2022, Studio Album/EP, NFT package)

References

External links
Anyone Official Website
Record label Website
Riz Story - The Official Website
Anyone

Musical groups from California